Iqer was a nome in ancient Egypt, the sixth Upper province. Its capital was Iunet, modern Denderah. The name of the nome was written with the sign of a crocodile. The reading of this sign is not certain, Iq is another option. On the white chapel of Senusret I appears a list of all Egyptian nomes. Here the goddess Hathor is called lady of Iq. Next to Iunet, where Hathor was worshipped, a place called Shabet was lying in the sixth Upper Egyptian nome, another place was Khadj. The exact locations of these towns is uncertain.

The nome is already mentioned in a Fourth Dynasty inscription dating from the reign of the Pharaoh Snofru. In the Ptolemaic (Greco-Roman) period, the nome was called Tentyrites, after Denderah, that appears in Greek sources as Tentyris. Several strategoi (governors) are known.

References 

Nomes of ancient Egypt